Meurisse is a surname. Notable people with the surname include:
 Catherine Meurisse (born 1980), French cartoonist
 Jacky Meurisse (born 1965), Belgian musician
 Nina Meurisse (born 1988), French actress
 Paul Meurisse (1912–1979), French actor
 Xandro Meurisse (born 1992), Belgian cyclist